Llandevaud is a small hamlet in east Newport, Wales with a church about a half mile from the village centre, going down towards The Foresters Oaks, a restaurant and public house, previously named the Rising Sun. Near the church was a primary school, now a private dwelling, which closed down in the early 1960s. The last teachers at the school, the Phillipses, husband and wife, lived on the premises. At the time of its closure there were 25 pupils attending the school. Pupils were transferred to another larger school at Langstone, nearby.

Villages in Newport, Wales
Districts of Newport, Wales